Jacob Matthew Ramsey (born 28 May 2001) is an English professional footballer who plays as a midfielder for  club Aston Villa. 

Ramsey is a product of the Aston Villa Academy and has represented England at youth level, he is currently a member of the under-21 squad. Ramsey played on loan for Doncaster Rovers in 2020 before the 2019–20 EFL League One season was curtailed due to the coronavirus pandemic. His younger brother Aaron also plays for Aston Villa.

Club career
Ramsey joined the youth academy of Aston Villa at the age of 6. He was often amongst the smallest players in his age group in youth football and would supplement his football training with boxing training with his father, an ex-professional boxer, in order to build muscle.

On 15 January 2019, Ramsey signed a professional contract with Aston Villa. Ramsey caught national attention playing for Aston Villa U18s in the 2018–19 FA Youth Cup, scoring 2 goals in every round, until the Fifth Round. On 2 February 2019, Ramsey was given a straight red card less than ten minutes into Villa's Fifth Round defeat against AFC Bournemouth U18s. While suspended for the youth team, Ramsey joined first team training to "make up the numbers" during a spate of injuries. After training with the first team, Ramsey was selected by manager Dean Smith to be on the bench and then made his professional debut with Aston Villa as a 61st minute substitute in a 2–0 Championship loss to West Bromwich Albion on 16 February 2019.

On 1 May 2019, at the Aston Villa End-of-Season awards, Ramsey was named "2018–19 Academy Player of the Season".

On 31 January 2020, Ramsey signed for Doncaster Rovers on loan for the remainder of the 2019–20 season. On the same day, he signed a new three-and-a-half-year contract with Aston Villa. On 4 February 2020, Ramsey made his Doncaster debut, in a 3–0 away victory over Tranmere Rovers, in which he scored his first two goals in senior football. However, the EFL League One season was initially postponed and, on 9 June 2020, ended due to the COVID-19 pandemic in the United Kingdom and Ramsey re-joined the Aston Villa squad ahead of the resumption of the Premier League.

On 15 September 2020, Ramsey was given his first ever start for Aston Villa, in a 3–1 victory over Burton Albion in the EFL Cup. On 12 December, he made his first league start for Villa in a 1–0 away win over West Midlands rivals Wolverhampton Wanderers.

On 9 February 2021, Ramsey signed a new four-and-a-half-year contract with the club. 

On 22 October 2021, Ramsey scored his first goal for Aston Villa in the Premier League, a late consolation goal in a 3–1 defeat to Arsenal. Ramsey was voted Aston Villa's player of the month for December 2021 by fans, a month in which he scored his second Premier League goal – a solo run and finish in a 2–0 victory over Norwich City which was also voted goal of the month. On 15 January 2022, Ramsey scored his first goal at Villa Park against Manchester United. On 9 February, Ramsey scored two goals against Leeds United, marking his first Premier League brace. On 26 April 2022, Ramsey signed a contract extension with Aston Villa, lasting until 2027. On 12 May, at Villa's 2021–22 End Of Season awards, Ramsey was voted Young Player of the Season by supporters, and Player's Player of the Season by his teammates.

On 6 November 2022, Ramsey scored an own goal and for Villa in the same game, a 3–1 home victory over Manchester United.

International career
Ramsey represented the England U18s at the UAE Sports Chain Cup in March 2019 and the Slovakia Cup in May 2019.

On 5 September 2019, Ramsey made his England U19s debut during a 3–1 victory over Greece at St. George's Park.

On 13 October 2020, Ramsey made his debut for the England U20s and scored during a 2–0 victory over Wales at St. George's Park.

On 7 October 2021, Ramsey made his debut for the England U21s during a 2–2 U21 EURO qualifying away draw to Slovenia. On 25 March 2022, Ramsey scored his first goal for England U21s, in a 4–1 victory over Andorra U21s.

Personal life
Ramsey was born in the Great Barr area of Birmingham and attended the Barr Beacon School. His younger brothers are both also at Aston Villa, Aaron plays for Middlesbrough F.C, on loan from Villa and Cole is in the academy set-up. His father Mark was a professional boxer, who fought future unified light-welterweight world champion Ricky Hatton twice early in his career, losing both times on a points decision.

Career statistics

References

External links
Profile at the Aston Villa F.C. website

2001 births
Living people
People from Great Barr
Footballers from Birmingham, West Midlands
English footballers
England youth international footballers
England under-21 international footballers
English people of Jamaican descent
Association football midfielders
Aston Villa F.C. players
Doncaster Rovers F.C. players
Premier League players
English Football League players
Black British sportspeople